The Utah State Aggies are a Division I women's college basketball team that plays in the Mountain West Conference, representing Utah State University. They play their home games at the Smith Spectrum.

History
The Aggies started play in 1972. They made the AIAW First Round in their first three years and the regionals in 1982, but they won only 18 games in the last five years of the program's first run in basketball. The women's team was shuttered from 1988 to 2002. Utah State played in the Intermountain Athletic Conference from 1973 to 1982, played as an Independent from 1982 to 1984, the High Country Athletic Conference from 1984 to 1987, the Big West Conference from 2003 to 2005, and the Western Athletic Conference from 2006 to 2013 before joining the Mountain West Conference in 2014.

The Aggies have made appearances in the WNIT in 2011 and 2012, as well as the three appearances in WBI tournaments. The Aggies have never won a conference title, and as a result have never qualified for the NCAA Division I women's basketball tournament.

In November 2019, Jerry Finkbeiner, in his eight season as head coach of the Aggies, stepped down due to medical reasons. His three postseason tournament appearances are the most among Aggies head coaches all-time.

In March 2020, Southeastern Louisiana alum Kayla Ard was named as head coach. Under Ard, the Aggies have amassed 3 straight losing seasons, including 26 losses in 2022-23, which is tied for the most losses by any Utah State women's basketball team in program history.

Postseason

WNIT 
The Aggies have appeared in two WNIT tournaments. Their combined record is 1–2.

WBI 
The Aggies have appeared in three Women's Basketball Invitational tournaments. Their combined record is 1–3.

AIAW Division I
The Aggies made four appearances in the AIAW National Division I basketball tournament, with a combined record of 1–8.

References

External links
 

 
1972 establishments in Utah